Joseph Sabobo Banda (born 17 December 2005) is a Zambian footballer currently playing as a forward for Red Arrows, on loan from Atletico Lusaka.

Club career
Sabobo Banda grew up in Chaisa, Lusaka, and represented Atletico Lusaka in the Lusaka Provincial League, finishing as top scorer in 2021. These performances caught the eye of Zambia Super League team Red Arrows, who signed him on an 18-month loan deal in January 2022.

In February 2022, he went on trial with Spanish giants Barcelona.

International career
A prolific goal-scorer for the Zambian under-17 side, Sabobo Banda has been called up to the Zambia national football team on multiple occasions, the first call-up coming when he was 14 years old.

References

External links
 

2005 births
Living people
Zambian footballers
Zambia youth international footballers
Association football forwards
Red Arrows F.C. players